Bağlıca is a village in the Uludere District of Şırnak Province in Turkey. The village is populated by Kurds of the Goyan tribe and had a population of 636 in 2021.

The hamlet of Kalemli is attached to Bağlıca.

The village was depopulated in the 1990s during the Kurdish–Turkish conflict.

References 

Villages in Uludere District
Kurdish settlements in Şırnak Province